Kurattikadu Pattambalam Devi Kshethram is a Devi Temple in Mannar, Kerala, India. The main ritual of the temple is the Anpoli Vazhipadu during Anpoli Areeppara, the most important event at the temple, an annual 18-day festival from Medam 10th to 27th. The main deity worshipped is the goddess Bhadrakali, along with Bhadra, Ganapati, and Goshala Krishna. At this temple Bhadrakali is also known as Valiya Amma ("Great Mother").

The temple manages the nearby Sree Bhuvaneswari Higher Secondary School.

See also
 Temples of Kerala

References

External links 
 The official website of the temple
 The official website of the school

Hindu temples in Alappuzha district